What Do You Know About Love? is an album by singer and actress Della Reese. The album was her fifth for Jubilee Records, and it was directed and conducted by Reg Owen.

The album was released on Compact Disc alongside her 1958 album Amen!, for the first time in 2008, by Collector's Choice.

Track listing

 "What Do You Know About Love?" (Good, Scarf) 3:09
 "When I Fall in Love" (Heyman, Young) 3:13
 "Something I Dreamed Last Night"  (Fain, Magidson, Yellen) 3:33
 "I Got It Bad"  (Ellington, Webster) 3:20
 "I'll Never Be The Same"  (Kahn, Malneck, Signorelli) 2:13
 "You Better Go Now"  (Graham, Reichner) 2:45
 "I'm Nobody's Baby"  (Ager, Davis, Santly) 3:11
 "I Never Knew"  (Egan, Marsh, Pitts, Whiteman) 3:07
 "I Thought of You Last Night"  (Freed) 2:10 
 "You Don't Know What Love Is"  (DePaul, Raye) 2:40 
 "I'm Thru with Love"  (Kahn, Livingston, Malneck) 3:19
 "That's All There Is"  (Jenkins) 2:21

References

Della Reese albums
Big band albums
Jubilee Records albums
1959 albums
Albums conducted by Reg Owen
Collectors' Choice Music albums